Lydia Belkacemi (born 2 March 1994) is an Algerian footballer who plays for Brest and the Algeria national team.

She played for Algeria at the 2018 Africa Women Cup of Nations, where she scored in the match against Mali.

She had previously represented the France national under-16, under-17, and under-19 teams.

References

External links
 
 

1994 births
Living people
French women's footballers
Algerian women's footballers
Algeria women's international footballers
Women's association football midfielders
Division 1 Féminine players
ASJ Soyaux-Charente players
People from Béjaïa Province
21st-century Algerian people